Samsung Galaxy Beam may refer to:

 Samsung Galaxy Beam i8520
 Samsung Galaxy Beam i8530